This is a partial list of human eye diseases and disorders.

The World Health Organization publishes a classification of known diseases and injuries, the International Statistical Classification of Diseases and Related Health Problems, or ICD-10. This list uses that classification.

H00-H06 Disorders of eyelid, lacrimal system and orbit 
 (H02.1) Ectropion
 (H02.2) Lagophthalmos
 (H02.3) Blepharochalasis
 (H02.4) Ptosis
 (H02.5) Stye, an acne type infection of the sebaceous glands on or near the eyelid.
 (H02.6) Xanthelasma of eyelid
 (H03.0*) Parasitic infestation of eyelid in diseases classified elsewhere
 Dermatitis of eyelid due to Demodex species ( B88.0+ )
 Parasitic infestation of eyelid in:
 leishmaniasis ( B55.-+ )
 loiasis ( B74.3+ )
 onchocerciasis ( B73+ )
 phthiriasis ( B85.3+ )
 (H03.1*) Involvement of eyelid in other infectious diseases classified elsewhere
 Involvement of eyelid in:
 herpesviral (herpes simplex) infection ( B00.5+ )
 leprosy ( A30.-+ )
 molluscum contagiosum ( B08.1+ )
 tuberculosis ( A18.4+ )
 yaws ( A66.-+ )
 zoster ( B02.3+ )
 (H03.8*) Involvement of eyelid in other diseases classified elsewhere
 Involvement of eyelid in impetigo ( L01.0+ )
 (H04.0) Dacryoadenitis
 (H04.2) Epiphora
 (H06.2*) Dysthyroid exophthalmos it is shown that if your eye comes out that it will shrink because the optic fluids drain out

H10-H13 Disorders of conjunctiva 
 (H10.0) Conjunctivitis – inflammation of the conjunctiva commonly due to an infection or an allergic reaction
 (H11.129) Conjunctival concretion - development of hard deposits under the eyelid

H15-H22 Disorders of sclera, cornea, iris and ciliary body 
 (H15.0) Scleritis — a painful inflammation of the sclera
 (H16) Keratitis — inflammation of the cornea
 (H16.0) Corneal ulcer / Corneal abrasion — loss of the surface epithelial layer of the eye's cornea
 (H16.1) Snow blindness / Arc eye — a painful condition caused by exposure of unprotected eyes to bright light
 (H16.1) Thygeson's superficial punctate keratopathy
 (H16.4) Corneal neovascularization
 (H18.5) Fuchs' dystrophy — cloudy morning vision
 (H18.6) Keratoconus — degenerative disease: the cornea thins and changes shape to be more like a cone than a parabole
 (H19.3) Keratoconjunctivitis sicca — dry eyes
 (H20.0) Iritis — inflammation of the iris
 (H20.0, H44.1) Uveitis — inflammatory process involving the interior of the eye; Sympathetic ophthalmia is a subset.

H25-H28 Disorders of lens 
 (H25) Cataract — the lens becomes opaque
 (H26) Myopia - close object appears clearly , but far ones doesn't
 (H27) Hypermetropia - Nearby objects appears blurry
 (H28) Presbyopia - inability to focus on nearby objects

H30-H36 Disorders of choroid and retina

H30 Chorioretinal inflammation 

(H30) Chorioretinal inflammation
 (H30.0) Focal chorioretinal inflammation
 Focal:
 chorioretinitis
 choroiditis
 retinitis
 retinochoroiditis
 (H30.1) Disseminated chorioretinal inflammation
 Disseminated:
 chorioretinitis
 choroiditis
 retinitis
 retinochoroiditis
Excludes: exudative retinopathy (H35.0)
 (H30.2) Posterior cyclitis
 Pars planitis
 (H30.8) Other chorioretinal inflammations
 Harada's disease
 (H30.9) Chorioretinal inflammation, unspecified
 Chorioretinitis
 Choroiditis
 Retinitis
 Retinochoroiditis

H31 Other disorders of choroid 

(H31) Other disorders of choroid
 (H31.0) Chorioretinal scars
 Macula scars of posterior pole (postinflammatory) (post-traumatic)
 Solar retinopathy
 (H31.1) Choroidal degeneration
 Atrophy
 Sclerosis
 Excludes: angioid streaks (H35.3)
 (H31.2) Hereditary choroidal dystrophy
 Choroideremia
 Dystrophy, choroidal (central areolar) (generalized) (peripapillary)
 Gyrate atrophy, choroid
 Excludes: ornithinaemia ( E72.4 )
 (H31.3) Choroidal haemorrhage and rupture
 Choroidal haemorrhage:
 NOS (Not Otherwise Specified)
 expulsive
 (H31.4) Choroidal detachment
 (H31.8) Other specified disordes of choroid
 (H31.9) Disorder of choroid, unspecified

H32 Chorioretinal disorders in diseases classified elsewhere 

(H32) Chorioretinal disorders in diseases classified elsewhere
 (H32.0) Chorioretinal inflammation in infectious and parasitic diseases classified elsewhere
 Chorioretinitis:
 syphilitic, late ( A52.7+ )
 toxoplasma ( B58.0+ )
 tuberculosis ( A18.5+ )
 (H32.8) Other chorioretinal disorders in diseases classified elsewhere

H33 Retinal detachments and breaks 

 (H33) Retinal detachment — the retina detaches from the choroid, leading to blurred and distorted vision
 (H33.1) Retinoschisis — the retina separates into several layers and may detach

H34 Retinal vascular occlusions 
A retinal vessel occlusion is a blockage in the blood vessel at the back of your eye that can result in sight loss.

H35 Other retinal disorders 
 (H35.0) Hypertensive retinopathy — burst blood vessels, due to long-term high blood pressure
 (H35.0/E10-E14) Diabetic retinopathy — damage to the retina caused by complications of diabetes mellitus, which could eventually lead to blindness
 (H35.0-H35.2) Retinopathy — general term referring to non-inflammatory damage to the retina
 (H35.1) Retinopathy of prematurity — scarring and retinal detachment in premature babies
 (H35.3) Age-related macular degeneration — the photosensitive cells in the macula malfunction and over time cease to work
 (H35.3) Macular degeneration — loss of central vision, due to macular degeneration
 Bull's Eye Maculopathy
 (H35.3) Epiretinal membrane — a transparent layer forms and tightens over the retina
 (H35.4) Peripheral retinal degeneration
 (H35.5) Hereditary retinal dystrophy
 (H35.5) Retinitis pigmentosa — genetic disorder; tunnel vision preceded by night-blindness
 (H35.6) Retinal haemorrhage
 (H35.7) Separation of retinal layers
 Central serous retinopathy
 Retinal detachment: Detachment of retinal pigment epithelium
 (H35.8) Other specified retinal disorders
 (H35.81) Macular edema — distorted central vision, due to a swollen macula
 (H35.9) Retinal disorder, unspecified

H36 Retinal disorders in diseases classified elsewhere 
 (H36.0) Diabetic retinopathy

H40-H42 Glaucoma 
 (H40.1) Primary open-angle glaucoma
 (H40.2) Primary angle-closure glaucoma
 (H40.3) Primary Normal tension glaucoma

H43-H45 Disorders of vitreous body and globe 

 (H43.9) Floaters — shadow-like shapes which appear singly or together with several others in the field of vision

H46-H48 Disorders of optic nerve and visual pathways 
 (H47.2) Leber's hereditary optic neuropathy — genetic disorder; loss of central vision,.
 (H47.3) Optic disc drusen — globules progressively calcify in the optic disc, compressing the vascularization and optic nerve fibers

H49-H52 Disorders of ocular muscles, binocular movement, accommodation and refraction 
 (H49-H50) Strabismus (Crossed eye/Wandering eye/Walleye) — the eyes do not point in the same direction
 (H49.3-4) Ophthalmoparesis — the partial or total paralysis of the eye muscles
 (H49.4) Progressive external ophthaloplegia — weakness of the external eye muscles
 (H50.0, H50.3) Esotropia — the tendency for eyes to become cross-eyed
 (H50.1, H50.3) Exotropia — the tendency for eyes to look outward
 H52 Disorders of refraction and accommodation
 (H52.0) Hypermetropia (Farsightedness) — the inability to focus on near objects (and in extreme cases, any objects)
 (H52.1) Myopia (Nearsightedness) — distant objects appear blurred
 (H52.2) Astigmatism — the cornea or the lens of the eye is not perfectly spherical, resulting in different focal points in different planes
 (H52.3) Anisometropia — the lenses of the two eyes have different focal lengths
 (H52.4) Presbyopia — a condition that occurs with growing age and results in the inability to focus on close objects
 (H52.5)   Disorders of accommodation
 Internal ophthalmoplegia

H53-H54.9 Visual disturbances and blindness 
 (H53.0) Amblyopia (lazy eye) — poor or blurry vision due to either no transmission or poor transmission of the visual image to the brain
 (H53.0) Leber's congenital amaurosis — genetic disorder; appears at birth, characterised by sluggish or no pupillary responses
 (H53.1, H53.4) Scotoma (blind spot) — an area impairment of vision surrounded by a field of relatively well-preserved vision. See also Anopsia.
 (H53.5) Color blindness — the inability to perceive differences between some or all colors that other people can distinguish
 (H53.5) Achromatopsia / Maskun — a low cone count or lack of function in cone cells
 (H53.6) Nyctalopia (Nightblindness) — a condition making it difficult or impossible to see in the dark
 (H54) Blindness — the brain does not receive optical information, through various causes
 (H54/B73) River blindness — blindness caused by long-term infection by a parasitic worm (rare in western societies)
 (H54.9) Micropthalmia/coloboma — a disconnection between the optic nerve and the brain and/or spinal cord

H55-H59 Other disorders of eye and adnexa 
 (H57.9) Red eye — conjunctiva appears red typically due to illness or injury
 (H58.0) Argyll Robertson pupil — small, unequal, irregularly shaped pupils

Other codes 

The following are not classified as diseases of the eye and adnexa (H00-H59) by the World Health Organization:
 (B36.1) Keratomycosis — fungal infection of the cornea
 (E50.6-E50.7) Xerophthalmia — dry eyes, caused by vitamin A deficiency
 (Q13.1) Aniridia — a rare congenital eye condition leading to underdevelopment or even absence of the iris of the eye

See also 

 Endophthalmitis
 Corneal dystrophies in human
 Corrective lenses
 Fungal contamination of contact lenses
 Lists of diseases
 List of eye surgeries
 List of systemic diseases with ocular manifestations
 Ophthalmology

Notes 
Please see the References section below for the complete listing of information.

References 
 EyeWiki: The Eye Encyclopedia written by Eye Physicians & Surgeons (American Academy of Ophthalmology)
 International Statistical Classification of Diseases (WHO ICD-10) — Diseases of the eye and adnexa (ICD-10 codes H00-H59)

Eye diseases
Eye diseases